The 2001–02 NBA season was the 56th season for the Boston Celtics in the National Basketball Association. This season saw the Celtics select future All-Star Joe Johnson from the University of Arkansas with the tenth pick in the 2001 NBA draft, but later on traded him along with Randy Brown at midseason to the Phoenix Suns in exchange for Rodney Rogers and Tony Delk. The team also signed free agent Erick Strickland during the off-season. The Celtics struggled with a 5–6 start to the season, but then won 12 of their next 14 games, and held a 28–21 record at the All-Star break. They later on posted a 7-game winning streak in March, and won eight of their final nine games finishing second in the Atlantic Division with a 49–33 record, making their first playoff appearance since 1995.

Paul Pierce averaged 26.1 points, 6.9 rebounds and 1.9 steals per game, and was named to the All-NBA Third Team, while Antoine Walker averaged 22.1 points, 8.8 rebounds, 5.0 assists and 1.5 steals per game, and Kenny Anderson provided the team with 9.6 points, 5.3 assists and 1.9 steals per game. In addition, Strickland contributed 7.7 points per game off the bench, and Tony Battie provided with 6.9 points and 6.5 rebounds per game. Pierce and Walker were both selected for the 2002 NBA All-Star Game, which was Pierce’s first All-Star appearance.

In the Eastern Conference First Round of the playoffs, the Celtics defeated the Philadelphia 76ers in five games, advancing to the second round for the first time since 1992. In the Eastern Conference Semi-finals, they lost Game 1 to the 2nd-seeded Detroit Pistons, 96–84 on the road, but managed to defeat them four games to one, reaching the Conference Finals also for the first time since 1988. In the Eastern Conference Finals, the Celtics took a 2–1 series lead over the top-seeded New Jersey Nets. However, they would lose to the Nets in six games. The Nets would go on to reach the NBA Finals for the first time, but would lose to the Los Angeles Lakers in four straight games.

Following the season, Anderson was traded along with Vitaly Potapenko to the Seattle SuperSonics, while Rogers signed as a free agent with the New Jersey Nets, Strickland signed with the Indiana Pacers, and Mark Blount signed with the Denver Nuggets.

Draft picks

Roster

Roster Notes
 Rookie point guard Omar Cook also holds American citizenship, but he represents Montenegro in international play. He was signed by the Celtics on April 16, but never played for the team.
 Small forward Roshown McLeod missed the entire season with a nerve ailment in his lower left leg, and never played for the Celtics.

Regular season

Standings

Record vs. opponents

Game log

|- align="center" bgcolor="#bbffbb"
| 1 || Tue. Oct. 30  || @ Cleveland Cavaliers  || 108–89 || Gund Arena ||1-0
|- align="center" bgcolor="edbebf"
| 2 || Wed. Oct. 31  || New Jersey Nets  || 92-95  || FleetCenter ||1-1
|-

|- align="center" bgcolor="#bbffbb"
| 3 || Fri. Nov. 2   || Chicago Bulls || 96-82 || FleetCenter || 2-1
|- align="center" bgcolor="edbebf"
| 4 || Sat. Nov. 3   || @ Milwaukee Bucks || 99-105 || Bradley Center || 2-2
|- align="center" bgcolor="#bbffbb"
| 5 || Wed. Nov. 7   || Washington Wizards || 104-95 || FleetCenter || 3-2
|- align="center" bgcolor="#bbffbb"
| 6 || Fri. Nov. 9   || Seattle SuperSonics || 104-94 || FleetCenter || 4-2
|- align="center" bgcolor="#bbffbb"
| 7 || Wed. Nov. 14  || Indiana Pacers || 101-93 || FleetCenter ||5-2
|- align="center" bgcolor="edbebf"
| 8 || Sat. Nov. 17  || @ Atlanta Hawks || 103-112 || Philips Arena || 5-3
|- align="center" bgcolor="edbebf"
| 9 || Wed. Nov. 21  || Atlanta Hawks || 85-92 || FleetCenter || 5-4
|- align="center" bgcolor="edbebf"
| 10 || Fri. Nov. 23 ||  Toronto Raptors || 89-91 || FleetCenter || 5-5
|- align="center" bgcolor="edbebf"
| 11 || Sat. Nov. 24 || @ Washington Wizards || 84-88 (OT) || MCI Center || 5-6
|- align="center" bgcolor="#bbffbb"
| 12 || Tue. Nov. 27 || @ Miami Heat || 84-83 || American Airlines Arena || 6-6
|- align="center" bgcolor="#bbffbb"
| 13 || Thu. Nov. 29 || @ Orlando Magic || 99-89 || TD Waterhouse Centre || 7-6
|-

|- align="center" bgcolor="#bbffbb"
| 14 || Sat. Dec. 1   || @ New Jersey Nets || 105-98 (OT) || Continental Airlines Arena || 8-6
|- align="center" bgcolor="#bbffbb"
| 15 || Sun. Dec. 2   || @ Toronto Raptors  || 85-69 || Air Canada Centre || 9-6
|- align="center" bgcolor="#bbffbb"
| 16 || Wed. Dec. 5   || Denver Nuggets  || 95-80 || FleetCenter || 10-6
|- align="center" bgcolor="#bbffbb"
| 17 || Fri. Dec. 7   || Phoenix Suns  || 109-102 (OT) || FleetCenter || 11-6
|- align="center" bgcolor="edbebf"
| 18 || Sat. Dec. 8   || @ Chicago Bulls || 84-87 || United Center || 11-7
|- align="center" bgcolor="#bbffbb"
| 19 || Tue. Dec. 11  ||  @ New York Knicks  || 102-93 (OT) || Madison Square Garden || 12-7
|- align="center" bgcolor="#bbffbb"
| 20 || Fri. Dec. 14  || Chicago Bulls  || 107-101 || FleetCenter || 13-7
|- align="center" bgcolor="#bbffbb"
| 21 || Sat. Dec. 15  || @ Charlotte Hornets || 106-97 || Charlotte Coliseum || 14-7
|- align="center" bgcolor="edbebf"
| 22 || Mon. Dec. 17  || @ Philadelphia 76ers || 83-99 || First Union Center || 14-8
|- align="center" bgcolor="#bbffbb"
| 23 || Wed. Dec. 19  || Cleveland Cavaliers || 104-98 || FleetCenter || 15-8
|- align="center" bgcolor="#bbffbb"
| 24 || Fri. Dec. 21  || Utah Jazz || 98-92 || FleetCenter || 16-8
|- align="center" bgcolor="#bbffbb"
| 25 || Sun. Dec. 23  || Memphis Grizzlies || 85-80 || FleetCenter || 17-8
|- align="center" bgcolor="edbebf"
| 26 || Wed. Dec. 26  || @ Utah Jazz || 86-99 || Delta Center || 17-9
|- align="center" bgcolor="edbebf"
| 27 || Thu. Dec. 27  || @ Phoenix Suns || 82-84 || America West Arena || 17-10
|- align="center" bgcolor="#bbffbb"
| 28 || Sat. Dec. 29  || @ Los Angeles Clippers || 105-103 (OT) || Staples Center || 18-10
|- align="center" bgcolor="edbebf"
| 29 || Sun. Dec. 30  || @ Sacramento Kings || 94-109 || ARCO Arena || 18-11
|-

|- align="center" bgcolor="#bbffbb"
| 30 || Wed. Jan. 2   || Orlando Magic || 110-94 || FleetCenter || 19-11
|- align="center" bgcolor="edbebf"
| 31 || Fri. Jan. 4   || Miami Heat || 66-89 || FleetCenter || 19-12
|- align="center" bgcolor="#bbffbb"
| 32 || Sat. Jan. 5   || @ New York Knicks || 90-81 || Madison Square Garden || 20-12
|- align="center" bgcolor="edbebf"
| 33 || Mon. Jan. 7   || @ Orlando Magic || 87-98 || TD Waterhouse Centre || 20-13
|- align="center" bgcolor="edbebf"
| 34 || Wed. Jan. 9   || San Antonio Spurs || 90-93 || FleetCenter || 20-14
|- align="center" bgcolor="#bbffbb"
| 35 || Fri. Jan. 11  || Detroit Pistons || 104-90 || FleetCenter || 21-14
|- align="center" bgcolor="#bbffbb"
| 36 || Sat. Jan. 12  || @ Atlanta Hawks || 115-91 || Philips Arena || 22-14
|- align="center" bgcolor="#bbffbb"
| 37 || Wed. Jan. 16  || New York Knicks || 101-100 || FleetCenter || 23-14
|- align="center" bgcolor="edbebf"
| 38 || Fri. Jan. 18  || Houston Rockets || 101-104 || FleetCenter || 23-15
|- align="center" bgcolor="edbebf"
| 39 || Sat. Jan. 19  || @ Detroit Pistons || 91-94 || The Palace of Auburn Hills || 23-16
|- align="center" bgcolor="#bbffbb"
| 40 || Mon. Jan. 21  || Toronto Raptors || 106-97 || FleetCenter || 24-16
|- align="center" bgcolor="#bbffbb"
| 41 || Wed. Jan. 23  || Indiana Pacers || 98-94 || FleetCenter || 25-16
|- align="center" bgcolor="edbebf"
| 42 || Fri. Jan. 25  || Philadelphia 76ers || 90-106 || FleetCenter || 25-17
|- align="center" bgcolor="#bbffbb"
| 43 || Sat. Jan. 26  || @ Cleveland Cavaliers || 108-101 || Gund Arena || 26-17
|- align="center" bgcolor="edbebf"
| 44 || Tue. Jan. 29  || @ Milwaukee Bucks || 90-109 || Bradley Center || 26-18
|- align="center" bgcolor="edbebf"
| 45 || Thu. Jan. 31  || @ Toronto Raptors || 92-97 || Air Canada Centre || 26-19
|-

|- align="center" bgcolor="edbebf"
| 46 || Fri. Feb. 1   || Minnesota Timberwolves || 95-98 (OT) || FleetCenter || 26-20
|- align="center" bgcolor="#bbffbb"
| 47 || Sun. Feb. 3   || Los Angeles Clippers || 104-91 || FleetCenter || 27-20
|- align="center" bgcolor="#bbffbb"
| 48 || Tue. Feb. 5   || @ Charlotte Hornets || 82-79 || Charlotte Coliseum || 28-20
|- align="center" bgcolor="edbebf"
| 49 || Wed. Feb. 6   || Sacramento Kings || 85-102 || FleetCenter || 28-21
|- align="center" bgcolor="#bbffbb"
| 50 || Tue. Feb. 12  || @ Denver Nuggets || 110-93 || Pepsi Center || 29-21
|- align="center" bgcolor="edbebf"
| 51 || Wed. Feb. 13  || @ Golden State Warriors || 75-92 || The Arena in Oakland || 29-22
|- align="center" bgcolor="#bbffbb"
| 52 || Fri. Feb. 15  || @ Portland Trail Blazers || 107-104 || Rose Garden || 30-22
|- align="center" bgcolor="edbebf"
| 53 || Sat. Feb. 16  || @ Seattle SuperSonics || 79-99 || KeyArena || 30-23
|- align="center" bgcolor="#bbffbb"
| 54 || Tue. Feb. 19  || @ Los Angeles Lakers || 109-108 || Staples Center || 31-23
|- align="center" bgcolor="edbebf"
| 55 || Thu. Feb. 21  || @ Dallas Mavericks || 92-98 || American Airlines Center || 31-24
|- align="center" bgcolor="edbebf"
| 56 || Sat. Feb. 23  || @ Houston Rockets || 89-99 || Compaq Center || 31-25
|- align="center" bgcolor="edbebf"
| 57 || Wed. Feb. 27  || Milwaukee Bucks || 92-95 || FleetCenter || 31-26
|-

|- align="center" bgcolor="edbebf"
| 58  || Fri. Mar. 1   || Charlotte Hornets || 87-100 || FleetCenter || 31-27
|- align="center" bgcolor="#bbffbb"
| 59  || Mon. Mar. 4   || @ Philadelphia 76ers || 100-94 || First Union Center || 32-27
|- align="center" bgcolor="#bbffbb"
| 60  || Wed. Mar. 6   || Orlando Magic || 130-110 || FleetCenter || 33-27
|- align="center" bgcolor="#bbffbb"
| 61  || Fri. Mar. 8   || Detroit Pistons || 117-92 || FleetCenter || 34-27
|- align="center" bgcolor="#bbffbb"
| 62  || Sun. Mar. 10  || Washington Wizards || 98-91 || FleetCenter || 35-27
|- align="center" bgcolor="#bbffbb"
| 63  || Mon. Mar. 11  || @ Washington Wizards || 104-99 || MCI Center || 36-27
|- align="center" bgcolor="#bbffbb"
| 64  || Wed. Mar. 13  || New Jersey Nets || 97-89 || FleetCenter || 37-27
|- align="center" bgcolor="#bbffbb"
| 65  || Fri. Mar. 15  || @ Memphis Grizzlies || 103-97 || The Pyramid || 38-27
|- align="center" bgcolor="edbebf"
| 66  || Sat. Mar. 16  || @ San Antonio Spurs || 104-111 || Alamodome || 38-28
|- align="center" bgcolor="edbebf"
| 67  || Mon. Mar. 18  || Portland Trail Blazers || 91-100 || FleetCenter || 38-29
|- align="center" bgcolor="#bbffbb"
| 68  || Wed. Mar. 20  || Cleveland Cavaliers || 96-70 || FleetCenter || 39-29
|- align="center" bgcolor="edbebf"
| 69  || Fri. Mar. 22  || Philadelphia 76ers || 91-96 || FleetCenter || 39-30
|- align="center" bgcolor="edbebf"
| 70  || Sun. Mar. 24  || @ Detroit Pistons || 101-109 || The Palace of Auburn Hills || 39-31
|- align="center" bgcolor="#bbffbb"
| 71  || Mon. Mar. 25  || @ Miami Heat || 87-82 || American Airlines Arena || 40-31
|- align="center" bgcolor="#bbffbb"
| 72  || Wed. Mar. 27  || Golden State Warriors || 102-99 || FleetCenter || 41-31
|- align="center" bgcolor="edbebf"
| 73  || Fri. Mar. 29  || Dallas Mavericks || 82-108 || FleetCenter || 41-32
|- align="center" bgcolor="#bbffbb"
| 74  || Sun. Mar. 31  || Milwaukee Bucks || 110-80 || FleetCenter || 42-32
|-

|- align="center" bgcolor="#bbffbb"
| 75  || Tue. Apr. 2  || @ Indiana Pacers || 105-94 || Conseco Fieldhouse || 43-32
|- align="center" bgcolor="#bbffbb"
| 76  || Fri. Apr. 5  || Los Angeles Lakers || 99-81 || FleetCenter || 44-32
|- align="center" bgcolor="#bbffbb"
| 77  || Sun. Apr. 7  || @ New Jersey Nets || 102-90 || Continental Airlines Arena || 45-32
|- align="center" bgcolor="edbebf"
| 78  || Mon. Apr. 8  || @ Chicago Bulls || 100-105 || United Center || 45-33
|- align="center" bgcolor="#bbffbb"
| 79  || Wed. Apr. 10 || Miami Heat || 70-65 || FleetCenter || 46-33
|- align="center" bgcolor="#bbffbb"
| 80  || Fri. Apr. 12 || New York Knicks || 107-92 || FleetCenter || 47-33
|- align="center" bgcolor="#bbffbb"
| 81  || Mon. Apr. 15 || @ Minnesota Timberwolves || 93-90 || Target Center || 48-33
|- align="center" bgcolor="#bbffbb"
| 82  || Wed. Apr. 17 || Atlanta Hawks || 89-81 || FleetCenter || 49-33
|-

|-
| 2001-02 Schedule

Playoffs

|- align="center" bgcolor="#ccffcc"
| 1
| April 21
| Philadelphia
| W 92–82
| Paul Pierce (31)
| Paul Pierce (11)
| Kenny Anderson (5)
| FleetCenter18,624
| 1–0
|- align="center" bgcolor="#ccffcc"
| 2
| April 25
| Philadelphia
| W 93–85
| Paul Pierce (25)
| Pierce, Walker (10)
| three players tied (4)
| FleetCenter18,624
| 2–0
|- align="center" bgcolor="#ffcccc"
| 3
| April 28
| @ Philadelphia
| L 103–108
| Paul Pierce (29)
| Rodney Rogers (11)
| Paul Pierce (7)
| First Union Center20,689
| 2–1
|- align="center" bgcolor="#ffcccc"
| 4
| May 1
| @ Philadelphia
| L 81–83
| Antoine Walker (25)
| Paul Pierce (8)
| Kenny Anderson (8)
| First Union Center20,904
| 2–2
|- align="center" bgcolor="#ccffcc"
| 5
| May 3
| Philadelphia
| W 120–87
| Paul Pierce (46)
| Antoine Walker (9)
| Pierce, Walker (6)
| FleetCenter18,624
| 3–2
|-

|- align="center" bgcolor="#ffcccc"
| 1
| May 5
| @ Detroit
| L 84–96
| Antoine Walker (20)
| Paul Pierce (10)
| Paul Pierce (5)
| The Palace of Auburn Hills20,252
| 0–1
|- align="center" bgcolor="#ccffcc"
| 2
| May 8
| @ Detroit
| W 85–77
| Paul Pierce (22)
| Tony Battie (11)
| Kenny Anderson (5)
| The Palace of Auburn Hills22,076
| 1–1
|- align="center" bgcolor="#ccffcc"
| 3
| May 10
| Detroit
| W 66–64
| Paul Pierce (19)
| Tony Battie (10)
| Paul Pierce (5)
| FleetCenter18,624
| 2–1
|- align="center" bgcolor="#ccffcc"
| 4
| May 12
| Detroit
| W 90–79
| Antoine Walker (30)
| Paul Pierce (17)
| Paul Pierce (6)
| FleetCenter18,624
| 3–1
|- align="center" bgcolor="#ccffcc"
| 5
| May 14
| @ Detroit
| W 90–81
| Paul Pierce (18)
| Antoine Walker (13)
| Kenny Anderson (6)
| The Palace of Auburn Hills22,076
| 4–1
|-

|- align="center" bgcolor="#ffcccc"
| 1
| May 19
| @ New Jersey
| L 97–104
| Pierce, Walker (27)
| Tony Battie (11)
| Kenny Anderson (6)
| Continental Airlines Arena20,049
| 0–1
|- align="center" bgcolor="#ccffcc"
| 2
| May 21
| @ New Jersey
| W 93–86
| Antoine Walker (26)
| Paul Pierce (14)
| Kenny Anderson (7)
| Continental Airlines Arena19,850
| 1–1
|- align="center" bgcolor="#ccffcc"
| 3
| May 25
| New Jersey
| W 94–90
| Paul Pierce (28)
| Antoine Walker (12)
| Pierce, Walker (4)
| FleetCenter18,624
| 2–1
|- align="center" bgcolor="#ffcccc"
| 4
| May 27
| New Jersey
| L 92–94
| Paul Pierce (31)
| three players tied (9)
| four players tied (4)
| FleetCenter18,624
| 2–2
|- align="center" bgcolor="#ffcccc"
| 5
| May 29
| @ New Jersey
| L 92–103
| Paul Pierce (24)
| Antoine Walker (13)
| Kenny Anderson (6)
| Continental Airlines Arena19,850
| 2–3
|- align="center" bgcolor="#ffcccc"
| 6
| May 31
| New Jersey
| L 88–96
| Kenny Anderson (18)
| Antoine Walker (9)
| Kenny Anderson (7)
| FleetCenter18,624
| 2–4
|-

Player statistics

Awards and records
 Paul Pierce, All-NBA Third Team

Transactions

See also
Reebok Pro Summer League, a summer league hosted by the Celtics

References

Boston Celtics seasons
Boston Celtics
Boston Celtics
Boston Celtics
Celtics
Celtics